"The Bear and the Maiden Fair" is the seventh episode of the third season of HBO's fantasy television series Game of Thrones, and the 27th episode of the series overall. The episode was written by George R. R. Martin, the author of the A Song of Ice and Fire novels on which the series is based, and was directed by Michelle MacLaren, her directorial debut for the series.

The plot of the episode advances the storylines of Daenerys's arrival to the city of Yunkai, the repercussions of the upcoming marriage of Tyrion Lannister and Sansa Stark, and Brienne's fate at the ruined castle of Harrenhal. The title of the episode refers to "The Bear and the Maiden Fair", a popular song among commoners and noblemen within the series' universe, which had been introduced four episodes earlier. In this episode, it refers to Brienne of Tarth (the maiden fair) facing a real bear.

Plot

Outside Yunkai
Daenerys and her army reach Yunkai. Daenerys tells Jorah she will take the city to free its 200,000 slaves. An envoy, Razdal mo Eraz, is sent to offer terms, which include gold and as many ships as she wants. Daenerys refuses his offer, demanding the slaves of the city be freed and compensated for their service or she will attack.

In King's Landing
Sansa is comforted by Margaery, who has heard of her betrothal to Tyrion. Elsewhere, Tyrion and Bronn discuss the match and how it will affect Shae. Tywin meets with Joffrey who asks what they should do about the rumors of Daenerys and her dragons, but Tywin claims there is no threat.

On Blackwater Bay, Melisandre reveals to Gendry that his father was King Robert Baratheon.

In the North
Jon and the wildling party continue their journey south. Soon after, Orell speaks to Ygritte, confessing his love for her and trying to convince her that Jon is still loyal to the Night's Watch. Later, Jon tells Ygritte that the wildling cause is hopeless, but she remains undaunted.

Theon is freed from his constraints by two young women who begin pleasuring him. They are soon interrupted by his tormenter, who mocks Theon's sexual prowess, before ordering his men to restrain Theon as he removes his genitals.

Heading north, Osha continues to grow suspicious of the Reeds, calling Jojen's visions "black magic". When she says they have to continue, Jojen reveals that the three-eyed raven is north of the Wall. Osha refuses to allow them to go north of the Wall, relating to them the story of her husband's disappearance, his return as a wight and her having to burn their home down with him inside.

In the Riverlands
Robb, his advisors, and his army are delayed by rain in their march toward the Twins for Edmure's wedding to Roslin Frey. Catelyn and the Blackfish discuss their distaste for Walder Frey, who will see their delay and Robb's oath-breaking as slights against his family. Talisa reveals to Robb that she is pregnant.

At the Brotherhood's hideout, Arya berates Beric and Thoros for taking money for Gendry. When Anguy tells Beric of a Lannister raiding party near them, he orders the men to move out in pursuit. Arya calls Beric a liar, and runs away but is quickly captured by the Hound.

At Harrenhal, Jaime visits Brienne in her cell and before he leaves, she makes him swear to uphold his oath to Catelyn and return the Stark girls to their mother. Later, Qyburn informs Jaime that Brienne will not be ransomed by Locke. He blackmails the party leader, Steelshanks, to order their return to Harrenhal. There, Jaime finds that Brienne has been forced to fight a grizzly bear while armed only with a wooden sword. Jaime leaps into the pit to protect her and manages to free Brienne from Locke and leaves.

Production

Writing

The episode was written by George R. R. Martin, author of the novels of the A Song of Ice and Fire saga that the show adapts. "The Bear and the Maiden Fair" is based on material from the third book of his series, A Storm of Swords, adapting chapters 42 to 46 (Jon V, Daenerys IV, Arya VIII, Jaime VI and Catelyn V).

In some of the scenes, Martin had to take into account the changes done by the production to some of his original plots or characters, writing scenes that could never happen in the novels: the books have Talisa's counterpart stay in Riverrun instead of following Robb, Melisandre never interacts with Gendry, and Sansa does not get to confide with Margaery.

Martin initially titled the episode "Autumn Storms", because it was supposed to be raining in many of the scenes. When he was forced to change it because most of the rains had been cut from his script in pre-production, he came up with the title "Chains", that worked both in a literal and metaphorical level. However, later on, the final scene including the bear that had been originally written by showrunners Benioff and Weiss for the next episode was incorporated, and the episode was given its final title.

Casting
To play the part of the bear at Harrenhal, the producers chose the nearly nine-foot-tall Alaskan brown bear Bart the Bear 2 (a.k.a. "Little Bart"), who was born in 2000 and trained by Doug and Lynne Seus (the same trainers of his well-known predecessor, the original Bart the Bear).

Filming locations

The production continued to use Morocco to depict the Slaver's Bay. While the coastal city of Essaouira had doubled as Astapor, this episode used the city of Aït Benhaddou (near Ouarzazate) to depict Yunkai. Daenerys's camp was built in the nearby location of Little Barrage.

The scenes with Jon Snow and the wildlings were filmed in the forests around Toome, in County Antrim, Northern Ireland. The scenes in Northern Ireland were filmed six weeks before the production moved to Iceland to film several scenes for the previous episodes.

Due to the legal restrictions and the difficulties involved in the transport of large animals, the scenes with the bear Little Bart had to be filmed in the USA. Although it was only used for a single scene, this was the fifth country where the production filmed during the season (after Northern Ireland, Morocco, Croatia, and Iceland). The actual bear-pit set was built in Northern Ireland: the bear was filmed where it was living in Los Angeles, interacting with its trainer, and was later digitally added into the footage from the bear pit set in Northern Ireland.

Reception

Ratings
4.84 million viewers watched the premiere airing of "The Bear and the Maiden Fair", a decrease of 0.67 million compared to the previous week. This ended the streak set during the four previous episodes, each of which established a new series high in ratings. 1.12 million people watched the second airing, bringing the total viewership of the night to 5.96 million. In the United Kingdom, the episode was seen by 1.023 million viewers on Sky Atlantic, being the channel's highest-rated broadcast that week.

Critical reception
The critical reception to the episode was generally favorable, although most commentators agreed that it was not among the best episodes of the third season, or the ones written by Martin. Review aggregator Rotten Tomatoes surveyed 21 reviews of the episode and judged 81% of them to be positive with an average score of 8.05 out of 10. The website's critical consensus reads, "'The Bear and the Maiden Fair" feels like a bit of a holding pattern as Game of Thrones moves its pieces into place for the final three episodes." The quality of the dialogue and characterization was widely praised. The A.V. Clubs David Sims found that the interactions felt more natural, and Elio Garcia from Westeros.org suggested that the characters "oozed a richer version of themselves".

Many reviews signaled the lack of focus as the main flaw of the episode, although they agreed that the story required preparing the stage for the final part of the season: Emily VanDerWerff wrote at The A.V. Club that it was a "somewhat disjointed hour, full of characters moving into place for what’s next (...) it nonetheless accomplishes what it sets out to do". According to Myles McNutt from Cultural Learnings, the episode "never evolves into a particularly exciting hour of television, content mostly to sketch out the boundaries of the season’s storylines in preparation for the oncoming climax."

The final scene, where Brienne is forced to fight a bear, was very well received: IGN's Matt Fowler called it "a spectacular moment", HitFix's Alan Sepinwall deemed it "gorgeously staged and executed", and David Sims found it "tense, thrilling television". Other scenes that were highlighted were the parley between Daenerys and the slaver, and the confrontation between Tywin and Joffrey. In the latter, the camera work used by director Michelle MacLaren was lauded.

In contrast, the scene featuring Theon's torture was criticized for what was seen as its gratuitous violence and nudity, and for the repetitiveness of the storyline over the season. Sepinwall declared that he had no need "to witness more of The Passion of the Greyjoy", and Sims considered it "boring and confusing to watch". VanDerWerff concluded: "Endless torture sequences don’t make for terribly exciting fiction, and that’s more or less bearing out here." On the other end of the spectrum, the reviewer for Time, James Poniewozik, considered it "chilling".

References

External links 

 "The Bear and the Maiden Fair" at HBO.com
 

2013 American television episodes
Game of Thrones (season 3) episodes
Obscenity controversies in television
Television controversies in the United States
Television episodes written by George R. R. Martin